Blue Heelers is an Australian police drama series that was produced by Southern Star Group and ran for 12 years on the Seven Network, from 1994 to 2006. Although based around the policing of the town, the series generally depicted the everyday lives and relationships of the residents of Mount Thomas, a fictional small town in Victoria. 

The series was one of the highest-rated and most-awarded programs in the history of Australian television, having won 25 Logie awards, and having equal standing with The Don Lane Show as the most awarded show in the history of the Logies. It is also noted for its two main stars Lisa McCune, a four-time recipient of the Gold Logie, and John Wood, who also won Gold.

Overview 
Blue Heelers was first aired on 10 September 1993, with the episode "A Woman's Place". The last episode, episode #510 titled "One More Day" aired on 4 June 2006. It series was produced by Southern Star Group for the Seven Network. During its 13-season run it won a total of 32 awards and was nominated for a further 50. This included 25 Logie Awards, five of which were the Gold Logie, the most coveted television award in Australia.

As well as everyday policing matters, the series deals with many controversial and "touchy" subjects. The series was the first to examine the stressful world of young police officers who are "thrown into the deep end where they are left to sink or swim".

Police procedurals were enormously popular in Australia in the 1960s and 1970s, but by the 1980s they had been replaced by home-grown soap operas and mini-series, like [Neighbboours]] and [Home and Away]] 

Blue Heelers, however, was Australia's most popular television drama while it lasted.  The series drew more than 2.5 million viewers every week at its peak. Along with the long-running Crawford Productions series Homicide, Blue Heelers holds the Australian record for most episodes produced of a weekly prime-time drama. It was also nearly the longest-running series, but Homicide lasted one calendar month longer and, due to five feature-length episodes, had more time on air.

Blue Heelers was sold to 108 territories and gained international recognition in the UK, Ireland, New Zealand, Canada and other countries.

The series launched the careers of many Australian actors, such as Lisa McCune, Grant Bowler, Ditch Davey, Rachel Gordon, Tasma Walton, Charlie Clausen and Jane Allsop. While many of these actors are still best known for their work on Blue Heelers, some have gone on to bigger roles. Many other actors of today also appeared in guest roles, including Hugh Jackman, Charles 'Bud' Tingwell, Peter O'Brien and John Howard. 

John Wood, alongside Julie Nihill remained the only actors with Blue Heelers to remain during its entire 12-year run, portraying Senior Sergeant Tom Croydon and  publican Chris Riley respectively.

Plot

The series primarily focuses on the daily lives of police officers working at a police station in the fictional small town of Mount Thomas in the Australian state of Victoria. Each episode is presented from the perspective of the officers. This was a specific technique that creator Hal McElroy chose to employ.

The police officers, commonly referred to as "Heelers", are always active sorting out the town's many problems. These problems range from trivial complaints such as land and fencing disputes to more serious offences, such as homicides and assaults. The small town is also faced with many other significant occurrences including bank robberies, escaped criminals, police shootings, kidnappings and the acts of deluded criminals. Of these, one of the more significant events is the bombing of the police station during the show's eleventh season.

Whenever overwhelmed, the Heelers call on the assistance of the police in the larger town of St Davids, home of the resident police inspector Russell Falcon-Price. An antagonist in the series, Falcon-Price often tries to terminate the employment of the Mount Thomas sergeant or to close the entire station, which in reality would be almost entirely out of his control.

Along with their police work, aspects of the Heelers' personal lives are regularly featured, notably the relationship between Maggie and PJ, which ends with Maggie's death in one of the most watched moments on Australian television.

Episodes

Cast

Main

Recurring/guest cast

Each episode featured a range of many well known guest cast members, and over the run of the series hundreds of actors featured in these roles.

As well as the main (regular) cast members, a number of well-known Australian actors frequently appeared as either recurring or semi-regular characters. These included

Guest roles
Many other notable actors also recurring guest or one off guest roles in Blue Heelers including Shane Bourne, Hugh Jackman, Gerard Kennedy, David Wenham, Marcus Graham, Peter O'Brien, Gary Sweet, Vince Colosimo,

Production 
On average, 42 episodes of Blue Heelers were broadcast per year on Australian television, with each episode comprising fifty scenes. One episode was made every week. The scripts were written to a formula which allowed one day for rehearsal, two days on location and two days in the studio. Episodes were shot eight to ten weeks ahead of their scheduled broadcast date. There were 16 episodes in various stages of production at any one time (from the conception of new storylines to post-production). In addition, there were always seven complete episodes waiting to go to air. Apart from the regular cast members, the show employed 4,300 guest actors annually, plus 30 extras every week. A total of 150 people were involved in some way with the show's production each week, including cast members, crew, wardrobe, publicists and writers.

Conception and development 
Blue Heelers creator/producer, Hal McElroy, conceived the idea of Blue Heelers when he heard that an eighteen-year-old friend was planning to become a police officer. Intrigued, he inquired as to why this young boy, fresh out of school, would want to become a police officer, as opposed to the many other opportunities he had open to him. McElroy soon discovered that, at the time, a staggering 60% of Australian police officers were under the age of 26. This, coupled with McElroy's desire to create a country cop show, formed the basis of the programme. When this same young officer left the force only a year later due to the shooting death of his colleague, McElroy was even more intrigued to learn about the very fickle, yet rewarding job of policing the community. McElroy continued his quest by asking ex-police officer Michael Winter to write down what it was like to be a city cop who transferred to a country town. These became the ideas that Blue Heelers was based around. Michael Winter also conceived the name of the programme by recounting the common names for a country police officer: "tyre-biters"—referring to the fact that country cops are often involved in car chases—and "blue heelers"—referring to their blue uniforms and overall similar appearance and persona to a Blue Heeler dog, a protective and intuitive breed of Australian dog. From the time that McElroy's idea was initially conceived, to the time the programme was ready to air, three years passed.

During the early development of Blue Heelers two completely different pilots were shot: one depicting the story from the perspective of a police officer and the other from the perspective of a criminal. When these were presented to the Seven Network, the network committed to 13 episodes of the first pilot.  The pilot went on to become the official first episode of Blue Heelers, telling the story of a new cop in town, Maggie Doyle, and her beginnings in Mount Thomas. Hal McElroy chose to discard the second pilot, realising it was a fatal mistake to be "with the criminals as they plotted the crime". He also conceived his rule that the producers of the show "couldn't have a camera in a room unless there was a copper there as well" (a rule shared by long-running UK Police drama The Bill). Hence, the basis of the show being from a police officer's perspective became a firm reality. (The only bending of this rule was with scenes featuring publican Chris; as she was billed with the main cast, she was given the same on-screen "rules" as the officers. In early episodes, before she worked at the station, this "rule" also applied to Wayne Patterson's wife Roz).

Hal McElroy gives his police adviser's opinion:

By creating the programme, McElroy and Morphett hoped to close the gap between to police and the public. They hoped to show the human side of the policing and that, like other citizens, police officers have feelings, regrets, aspirations and fears. They also hoped that the show would act as a tribute to the courage of police officers, who risk their lives everyday, never knowing if they would return home at the end of the day.

Filming locations 
Only about half of the footage for each episode was shot on location. Most of the scenes, including scenes in the police station and pub, were filmed at the Seven Network studios in Melbourne. Much of the filming on location was carried out in towns such as Williamstown, and the more established parts of Werribee. The scenes of the outside of the Mount Thomas police station were actually filmed at the old, disused Williamstown police station, which was then a private residence. Scenes at Mount Thomas High School were filmed at Williamstown High School. The town of Castlemaine was most often used as the backdrop for Mount Thomas, seen in almost every episode. Although the Blue Heelers' pilot was shot in Castlemaine, the cast and crew very rarely returned there to shoot further episodes; images of Castlemaine were usually just establishing shots. Chris Riley's fictional Imperial Hotel, for example, was actually the real Imperial Hotel in Castlemaine. Mount Thomas' fictional Commercial Hotel was filmed at the Willy Tavern in Williamstown. The second Mount Thomas police station, adopted during the programme's reform of 2004, was filmed at Newport Railway workshops. The Mount Thomas Hospital was filmed at the Werribee Mercy Hospital. Sunbury railway station was commonly used as the Mount Thomas railway station.
Hobson's Bay, and Wyndham, Victoria were also locations used in Blue Heelers.

2004 revamp: the station bombing 
After low ratings in 2003 and 2004, the producers and executives of Blue Heelers realised that there were apparent problems which could potentially lead to the series's downfall. In 2004 Blue Heelers lost the top ratings spot to McLeod's Daughters. During 2003 and 2004, Australian television drama was also at its "lowest point in a decade" and many popular shows were cancelled. As the show remained basically unchanged from its debut, ten years earlier, the production team decided that a revamp was in order.

At the beginning of season 11, the revamp began with new, more modern opening credits, using an electric guitar, rather than an acoustic.  Later in that season, a live episode, "Reasonable Doubt", was broadcast in hope of offering a short-term ratings boost and encourage more long-term viewers. Although an immediate success, the live episode did not bring about a sustained increase in ratings. Producers also hoped that a shift in direction, a change of mood and setting, and the addition of four cast members would cement Blue Heelers''' long-term future. They also wanted the show to remain relevant and more accurately reflect today's modern world:

The main plot, setting and character changes started in July 2004, with the airing of the episode "End of Innocence". In this episode, the main storyline was the bombing of the Mount Thomas police station. The blast killed popular main character Snr. Const. Jo Parrish (Jane Allsop) and recurring cast member Clancy Freeman, and injured the show's main protagonist, Senior Sergeant Croydon. After the bombing it was revealed that Croydon's wife, the Reverend Curtis, was missing. It was later revealed she had been brutally raped and murdered. These events brought about sweeping changes to the mood of not only Croydon, but also the mood of the entire show. The Daily Telegraph television writer Marcus Casey commented, "Mount Thomas has become a darker, grittier place, the people and cops in it transformed by an invasion of evil".
Consequently, the story changed its focus from the old Mount Thomas police station to the new one that was used until the show's cancellation in 2006. The Seven Network feared that in the modern post-9/11 world, a show about country police was no longer what audiences wanted. Storylines of the proceeding five episodes focused on the bombing of the station and the 4 new main characters: Rachel Gordon as Amy Fox, Geoff Morrell as Mark Jacobs, Samantha Tolj as Kelly O'Rourke and Danny Raco as Joss Peroni. Popular former cast member William McInnes also returned to the show, temporarily reprising his role as Nick Schultz. Producers hoped the new tone of the series, the new younger actors, and McInnes's role reprisal would lure back viewers who had stopped watching the programme. This new style of programme that Blue Heelers was embracing was a sign of the show trying to keep up with other larger television shows, particularly the CSI franchise.

The revamp of the series resulted in a 25% ratings increase, bringing the series's weekly viewership to 1.6 million people. Critical response after the event was reassuring, and it appeared that critics were approving of the drastic moves by Seven and Southern Star:

 Cancellation 
In the hope that viewing would increase, an 11-episode season in 2006 was commissioned by the Seven Network. However, the ratings spike begun in 2004 was not sufficient for the Seven Network to commit to continuing to produce the show. In January 2006, Seven officially announced that they had cancelled Blue Heelers, but would air a final shortened season of 11 episodes in mid-2006. At the time the show was still drawing 1.2 million viewers per week on average, down from the 3.5 million it was drawing at its peak. The announcement was front-page news on nearly all of Australia's major newspapers including The Sydney Morning Herald, The Daily Telegraph (Sydney), The Melbourne Herald Sun, The Melbourne Age and Brisbane's Courier Mail. Two different endings were shot for the final episode, which finished filming on 20 December 2005.  The first ending wrapped up all the show's storylines, while the second left the show open for another season; the second version was used.

For Blue Heelers' final season in 2006, it was moved from its primetime Wednesday-night timeslot, to a lower rating Saturday-night timeslot. In the Saturday timeslot Blue Heelers competed with The Bill, a British police drama which had become quite popular in Australia on the Australian Broadcasting Corporation and Saturday Night AFL Coverage on Fox Footy Channel and Network Ten. This move was slammed by leading cast member, John Wood.  Blue Heelers cancellation may also be related to Seven's AFL broadcast, which saw Seven invest $780m for the 5-year broadcasting rights of the game.

 Broadcast 

 Australia Blue Heelers originally aired on Tuesday nights at 7:30 pm on the Seven Network, thus it was limited to a PG content level restriction. When the series was hailed as a success it began the transition from this timeslot to the 8:30 pm timeslot on the same day. After the move, writers could explore more diverse storylines, as the show was restricted to an M rating. The third and fourth season premiers aired on Monday nights during the 8:30 pm timeslot, but the show moved back to its original slot before the next episode. In its fifth season, Blue Heelers moved to the Wednesday night 8:30 pm timeslot, which it occupied for most of its run, until the end of its twelfth season. This move was made to make way for hospital drama All Saints.

Starting in 2004, the Seven Network aired Blue Heelers weekdays at 2:00 pm. All episodes aired with the final episode airing in 2007. This made way for the broadcast of early episodes of All Saints.

Seasons generally ran in Australia from early February to late November. Each season generally consisted of 41 to 42 episodes. The eleventh season however, only consisted of 39 episodes, as the Seven Network had gained the rights to televise the 2004 Athens Olympic Games. In total, 510 episodes were aired: 509-hour-long standard episodes and one live episode. The live episode, titled "Reasonable Doubts", was filmed to celebrate Blue Heelers 10th year on the air. To prepare, the cast was given six days to memorise their lines.

The final episode of the 13th season aired as a 2-hour tribute.  It opened with an introduction from John Wood and concluded with a compilation of Blue Heelers moments from over its 13-season run.

Australian television quiz-show, The Weakest Link, hosted by Cornelia Frances, also aired a Blue Heelers special episode on 9 August 2001. Cast members John Wood, Neil Pigot, Ditch Davey, Jeremy Kewley, Jane Allsop, Suzi Dougherty, Paul Bishop, Caroline Craig and Peta Doodson took part in this special event.

In February 2014, repeats of series 12 started airing and in May 2014, repeats of series 13 aired on 7TWO. Blue Heelers has also screened on Hallmark Channel in Australia in various timeslots.

 International Blue Heelers had a strong following not only in Australia, but also worldwide; it has been sold to 108 territories and is shown in over 70 countries.

 New Zealand 

In New Zealand Blue Heelers screened on TV One in a popular timeslot. However, following the on-screen death of Maggie Doyle, ratings fell, and the show was moved to a 9:30 pm slot on Friday. Following that, the show moved to a late night Thursday slot where the rest of the episodes played out, with the show beginning anywhere between 11:30 pm and midnight. It aired its final episode on TV One on 20 March 2008.

 Ireland 
Debuted on RTÉ on 15 September 1995 and continued every Friday afternoon at 4:30 pm. In 1998, the show moved to Thursday's around 1.00am on RTE 2. In September 2001, season 5 debuted airing weekday mornings at 10:30 am on RTE 1. The 5 episode per week output meant the show quickly caught up with the Australian broadcast, and in 2004, RTÉ dropped back to single weekly episodes airing late night Thursday's, typically around 1 am. RTÉ began airing the final season on 30 May 2008 in a late night Saturday timeslot, and the final episode screened on 30 November 2008.
RTÉ began re-airing Blue Heelers weekly from episode one, commencing on 24 June 2009, usually around 4 am Sunday mornings. RTÉ screened all episodes in their original unedited state. The drama proved very popular in Ireland and rated very well.

 United States Blue Heelers aired briefly in the United States of America in the early 2000s on the short-lived cable channel Trio (carried primarily by DirecTV). No episode after number 76 was ever shown in the United States, and when Trio changed their programming in 2004, Blue Heelers was dropped from the schedule.   The series returned to US airwaves in September 2021 on the new digital network DigiTV, a channel devoted mainly to imported British and Australian series.

 Canada Blue Heelers was broadcast on Showcase in Canada, last airing on 15 May 1998.

 United Kingdom 
In the United Kingdom the series was broadcast on most stations on the ITV Network.  Many companies tended to screen the show as hour-long episodes in the afternoon (occasionally with necessary edits to suit the time slot, usually regarding profanity).

Carlton Television and Westcountry Television were the first to aired Blue Heelers in half-hour episodes originally on Mondays to Wednesdays, starting from 3 January 1995, however the series then switched to airing hour-long episodes. Central Television started in February 1995 with a late night 23.40 slot on Tuesdays before following other regions with a typically 14.20 slot. Central were one of the most consistent ITV regions to broadcast Blue Heelers, completing series 6 by early 2002. When the three Carlton owner station stated a uniformed schedule during 2002 Blue Heelers reverted to two-part half-hour episodes; with the final batch of episodes shown in the regions were from Season 7 finishing on Wednesday 20 November 2002.Blue Heelers also aired on Anglia Television, Meridian Television and Channel Television, typically Mondays at 2:20 pm, during the summer school holidays it was broadcast daily in a morning slot, until late 1998. Granada and border also screened the series from 1995 in the hour long format but by 1998 dropped the series. Ulster Television (UTV) began airing Blue Heelers in early 1995. The show initially screened 3 times a week, on Monday, Wednesday and Friday afternoons at 1:50 pm. They then moved it to the 2:20 pm slot later in the series. A few episodes also ran at 11:40 pm on Thursday nights, as they were considered unsuitable for daytime viewing. UTV cancelled Blue Heelers in 1998.

Scottish Television began aired hour-long episodes from 1995, airing on Fridays, and then later on Tuesdays from mid 1996, until episode 106, when the series was replaced by Murder She Wrote. The series then reappear on most Saturday afternoon during 1998 until 19 December.  During 1999 From April until early August the series was broadcast at 04.30am most weekday morning before being dropped completely.

HTV, Yorkshire Television and Tyne Tees Television all chose not to import the show.  When the English ITV contractors reformatted as one company in late 2002, regionally-run programmes such as Blue Heelers (which were at different points of the series in each region) disappeared from screens. No ITV region ever screened the series in full.  The show also aired on UK cable channel Carlton Select in the late 1990s, first screening the early episodes daily and then in a weekly slot Fridays at 20.00 as episodes became more recent. Episodes to the later part of the 1997 season were shown before the series was dropped.

Home media

 Home media overview 

 2005-2011: Paramount Pictures released each season of Blue Heelers on DVD.
 July 2013: The production company, Endemol Australia formerly Southern Star Productions stated there are no plans at this stage to re-release.
 November 2015: Channel 7 said that there are still no plans to re-release Blue Heelers on DVD or Blu-ray.
 May 2017: Via Vision Entertainment stated they would be re-releasing Blue Heelers on DVD.
 2017-2018: Via Vision Entertainment released four collection boxset sets of Blue Heelers which featured all 510 episodes.
 2018: Via Vision Entertainment released Blue Heelers: The Complete Collection.
 August 2018: 7PLUS (Channel 7 Streaming Service) starting releasing all episodes.

 VHS releases 

 DVD releases 

 Streaming 

 Reception 

 Critical response 

Described by critics before its launch as "A Country Practice meets Cop Shop", and as "the contemporary cousin of British cop show, Heartbeat", Blue Heelers was not anticipated by critics to become a hugely popular programme.  

 Viewership 
It became a hit TV show soon after it began airing.  During most of its broadcast, Blue Heelers was very popular in Australia, regularly attracting up to 2.5 million viewers, and up to 3.5 million viewers at its peak. Throughout the show's broadcast it continually drew a strong audience, regularly appearing among the top-rating prime time programmes on Australian television. Viewership of Blue Heelers never dropped below 1 million viewers. The episodes "Gold" and "Fool's Gold" (episodes 140 and 141), which aired during the programme's fourth season, were two of the most popular Blue Heelers episodes.  Each drew 2.5 million viewers, considered a huge achievement in 1997.Blue Heelers' executive producer, Gus Howard believed the show's popularity was due mainly to the quality of the cast.

Much of the show's sixth season, as well as the first 10 episodes of its seventh season, were the most watched episodes of the series. These episodes focus of the death of Maggie Doyle (played by Lisa McCune). Maggie's being shot and left for dead during episode 255, "One More Day", was ranked by TV Week as the third most memorable moment of a drama series on Australian television.

 Awards and nominations 

In terms of awards, Blue Heelers is regarded as one of the most successful programmes on Australian television.  Blue Heelers has been the recipient of many awards, including 25 Logie Awards, five of which are the prestigious Gold Logie, 3 AFI Television Awards, 3 People's Choice Awards, and 1 AWGIE Awards.Australian Television: Blue Heelers: awards & nominations Blue Heelers was nominated for a further twelve Gold Logies. Blue Heelers has also won multiple Silver Logies, including numerous Most Popular Actor, Most Popular Actress and Most Popular Programme awards, as well as many Outstanding Awards. Many Blue Heelers cast members have also presented awards at the Logies. In the 2005 50 Years 50 Shows poll, Blue Heelers was voted 37th greatest show on Australian television and ranked within the top ten dramas.

 Merchandise 

A CD Album titled "Music From Blue Heelers" was released in 1995. It included the Blue Heelers theme music, plus other songs related to the program, many of them Country songs.

The first full Blue Heelers novel, Maggie's Story, was written by Roger Dunn and released in 1997 by Coronet Books. In August 1998, a second novel, Tom's Story'', written by Cassandra Carter was released by Bolinda Publishing.

See also 

 List of Australian television series
 Mount Thomas
 Victoria Police
 List of longest-running Australian television series

References

External links 
Blue Heelers on 7plus

 Blue Heelers at the Australian Television Information Archive
 Blue Heelers at the National Film and Sound Archive

 
1990s Australian drama television series
Seven Network original programming
Television shows set in Victoria (Australia)
1994 Australian television series debuts
1990s Australian crime television series
2000s Australian crime television series
2006 Australian television series endings
Television series by Endemol Australia
English-language television shows
2000s Australian drama television series